Coleophora emberizella is a moth of the family Coleophoridae. It is found in Saudi Arabia.

References

emberizella
Moths described in 1985
Moths of Asia